Linda Lee Fagan (born July 1, 1963) is a United States Coast Guard admiral who serves as the 27th Commandant of the Coast Guard. Previously, in 2021 she became the 32nd Vice Commandant of the Coast Guard and the Coast Guard’s first female four-star admiral. Before that, she was the commander of the Coast Guard Pacific Area with prior terms as Coast Guard Deputy for Operations, Policy, and Capabilities, commander, First Coast Guard District, and commander, Coast Guard Sector New York. Fagan is also the Coast Guard's first Gold Ancient Trident, the officer with the longest service record in the Marine Safety Field. In April 2021, Secretary of Homeland Security Alejandro Mayorkas announced her nomination as the next Vice Commandant of the Coast Guard, succeeding Charles W. Ray. She was confirmed on June 17, 2021, and assumed office on June 18.

In April 2022, it was announced that Fagan would be nominated to succeed Karl L. Schultz as Commandant of the Coast Guard, making her the first woman in American history to lead a military service. Her nomination was sent to the United States Senate on April 7, 2022, receiving confirmation by unanimous consent on May 11. She assumed office on June 1.

Early life and education

Born in Columbus, Ohio, Fagan graduated from the United States Coast Guard Academy in 1985 with a B.S. degree in marine science. She later earned a Master of Marine Affairs degree from the University of Washington in 2000 and an M.S. degree in national security strategy from the Industrial College of the Armed Forces at the National Defense University in 2008.

≠==Awards and decorations==

Personal life and family
Fagan is the daughter of Jon Harley Keene and Loann Carol (Morris) Keene. Her daughter Aileen is also a United States Coast Guard Academy graduate.

References

|-

|-

|-

1963 births
Commandants of the United States Coast Guard
Dwight D. Eisenhower School for National Security and Resource Strategy alumni
Female admirals of the United States Coast Guard
Female generals and flag officers of the United States
Living people
Military personnel from Ohio
People from Columbus, Ohio
Recipients of the Coast Guard Distinguished Service Medal
Recipients of the Defense Superior Service Medal
Recipients of the Legion of Merit
United States Coast Guard Academy alumni
United States Coast Guard admirals
University of Washington alumni
Vice Commandants of the United States Coast Guard
Biden administration personnel